The 1983 World Orienteering Championships, the 10th World Orienteering Championships, were held in Zalaegerszeg, Hungary, 1–4 September 1983.

The championships had four events; individual contests for men and women, and relays for men and women.

Medalists

Results

Men's individual

Women's individual

References 

World Orienteering Championships
World Orienteering Championships
International sports competitions hosted by Hungary
World Orienteering Championships
Orienteering in Europe
Sport in Zalaegerszeg